The Secretary Bird is a British stage play by William Douglas Home.

The original run starred Kenneth More who appeared in it for a year. He described the play as "simple and straightforward, and has some witty dialogue." It was the biggest stage success of More's career.

It was adapted into an Italian film Duck in Orange Sauce.

Premise
A married man worries his wife his having an affair so he tries to make her jealousy with his secretary.

Reception
William Home wrote it at a time when sex comedies were out of fashion and the play was turned down by thirteen managers before being picked up by Tony Roye. It toured successfully in the provinces then made it to the West End with Kenneth More in the lead and produced by John Gale.

The play was very successful. Peter Saunders estimated it cost £6,500 to put on and made a profit of more than £300,000. 

The play was seen by Noel Coward who wrote in his diary for 3 November 1968:
I saw The Secretary Bird, which was not bad and much enhanced by Kenny More, who is a lovely, deft comedian in the proper Hawtrey, Du Maurier, Coward tradition! In fact he doesn’t apparently make any effort to get his effects and manages to get every one. No asking for laughs or begging for attention. Very satisfactory.

The play had a successful run in Australia starring Patrick Macnee.

References

External links
Complete copy of play at 
The Secretary Bird 1969 TV version at IMDB

British plays
1968 plays